Nettle refers to plants with stinging hairs, particularly those of the genus Urtica. It can also refer to plants which resemble Urtica species in appearance but do not have stinging hairs. Plants called "nettle" include:

 ball nettle – Solanum carolinense
 bull nettle
 Cnidoscolus stimulosus, bull nettle, spurge nettle
 Cnidoscolus texanus, Texas bull nettle
 Cnidoscolus urens, bull nettle
 Solanum elaeagnifolium, bull nettle, silver-leaf nettle, white horse-nettle
 dead nettle, dumb nettle
 Lamium, particularly Lamium album
 false nettle – Boehmeria
 flame nettle – Coleus
 hedge nettle – Stachys
 hemp nettle – Galeopsis
 horse nettle:
 Agastache urticifolia – horse-nettle
 Solanum carolinense – ball-nettle, Carolina horse-nettle
 Solanum dimidiatum – western horse-nettle, robust horse-nettle
 Solanum elaeagnifolium – bull nettle, silver-leaf nettle, white horse-nettle
 Solanum rostratum – horse-nettle
 nettle tree or tree nettle:
 Celtis
 Various species of the genus Dendrocnide
 Urera baccifera
 Urtica ferox
 nilgiri nettle, Himalayan giant nettle - Girardinia diversifolia
 painted nettle – Coleus blumei
 rock nettle – Eucnide
 small-leaved nettle – Dendrocnide photinophylla
 spurge nettle – Cnidoscolus
 stinging nettle
 Hesperocnide
 most, but not all subspecies of Urtica dioica
 Urtica incisa
 Urtica ferox
 tree nettle - see nettle tree
 white nettle
Lamium album
Pipturus argenteus
 wood nettle - Laportea canadensis

Set index articles on plant common names